Love in the Dark is a 1922 American silent drama film directed by Harry Beaumont and starring Viola Dana, Cullen Landis and Arline Pretty.

Cast
 Viola Dana as Mary Duffy
 Cullen Landis as Tim O'Brien
 Arline Pretty as Mrs. O'Brien
 Bruce Guerin as 'Red' O'Brien
 Edward Connelly as Dr. Horton
 Margaret Mann as Mrs. Horton
 John Harron as Robert Horton
 Charles West as Jimmy Watson

References

Bibliography
James Robert Parish & Michael R. Pitts. Film directors: a guide to their American films. Scarecrow Press, 1974.

External links
 

1922 films
1922 drama films
1920s English-language films
American silent feature films
Silent American drama films
American black-and-white films
Films directed by Harry Beaumont
Metro Pictures films
1920s American films